Warren Williams, is an Australian rock musician. In the 1950s, he was a pioneer of Australian rock music, forming the group Warren Williams and the Squares. 
Williams was a prolific songwriter.

The Squares 
A former child soprano, Williams formed Warren Williams and the Squares in January 1958, after the tradition of Bill Haley and His Comets. The group released their debut single "My Teenage Love" in December 1959 and "Kath-a-Leen" in April 1960. By the end of 1960, Williams left the Squares. His first single of his solo career was "My Little Girl", released at the end of 1960.

Television 
Warren Williams and the Squares made their first television appearance on Six O'Clock Rock the Johnny O'Keefe-hosted television show in July 1959. He was voted the sixth most popular artist on Six O'Clock Rock. He starred on the popular music TV show Bandstand in the 1950s and 1960s.

After the Squares 
Williams signed with the Leedon label in 1961 and released several singles, e.g. "A Star Fell From Heaven". This song reached the lower top 20 in 1961 in several Australian states. He went on to form his own publishing company, Williams-Conde Music Pty Ltd., with Franz Conde. Williams joined the Courtmen in March 1964. The Courtmen backed him on his song "It's Party Time".

In 1964, Beatlemania swept Australia. Williams' popularity began to lag with the rise of pop music. Williams took to performing in clubs and cabaret shows, and then the nostalgia circuit.

Warren Williams has four children, Warren Jr., Darren, Tracey and Andrew. The three boys are popular performers throughout Australia with their show "Brothers in Harmony" and their band named after their father's nickname "The Shy Guys" .

References 

Australian pop singers
Australian rock singers
Living people
Year of birth missing (living people)